Adam Goldstein (born January 22, 1988 in South Orange, New Jersey) is an American author, who started his own online software company, GoldfishSoft, at age 14 and wrote alongside David Pogue for The Missing Manual series at the age of 16. A graduate of The Pingry School and MIT, he co-founded travel startup Hipmunk with Reddit co-founder Steve Huffman in 2010. Goldstein served as CEO of Hipmunk from June 2010 through December 2018.

Goldstein has served at the Chief Technology Officer for BookTour.com, which he co-founded along with Chris Anderson and Kevin Smokler.

While still at MIT, Goldstein was President of the American Parliamentary Debate Association and a member of the Tau Epsilon Phi fraternity.

Bibliography
AppleScript: The Missing Manual
Switching to the Mac: The Missing Manual, Tiger Edition (with David Pogue)

References

External links
GoldfishSoft

Adam Goldstein at BookTour.com
Hipmunk
 Interview for Princeton Startup TV [video]

1988 births
Living people
American technology writers
Computer programmers
People from South Orange, New Jersey
Pingry School alumni
American chief technology officers
Massachusetts Institute of Technology alumni